The 1972 NCAA College Division basketball tournament involved 36 schools playing in a single-elimination tournament to determine the national champion of men's NCAA College Division college basketball as a culmination of the 1971-72 NCAA College Division men's basketball season. It was won by Roanoke, with Roanoke's Hal Johnston named the Most Outstanding Player.

Regional participants

*denotes tie

Regionals

New England - Worcester, Massachusetts
Location: Andrew Laska Gymnasium Host: Assumption College

Third Place - Bridgeport 107, Sacred Heart 89

Great Lakes - Evansville, Indiana
Location: Roberts Municipal Stadium Host: University of Evansville

Third Place - Kentucky Wesleyan 68, Wittenberg 64

Midwest - St. Louis, Missouri
Location: Mark Twain Building Host: University of Missouri-Saint Louis

Third Place - South Dakota 113, St. Olaf 91

South Atlantic - Salem, Virginia
Location: C. Homer Bast Center Host: Roanoke College

Third Place - Florida Southern 85, Mercer 83

South - Cleveland, Mississippi
Location: Walter Sillers Coliseum Host: Delta State University

Third Place - LSU–New Orleans 110, Transylvania 74

East - Southampton, New York
Location: Southampton Gym Host: Southampton College

Third Place - Ithaca 70, Buffalo State 58

Mideast - Akron, Ohio
Location: Memorial Hall Host: University of Akron

Third Place - Philadelphia U 86, Cheyney 82

West - Pueblo, Colorado
Location: Massari Arena Host: Southern Colorado State College

Third Place - UC Riverside 94, UC Irvine 75

*denotes each overtime played

National Finals - Evansville, Indiana
Location: Roberts Municipal Stadium Host: University of Evansville

Third Place - Tennessee State 107, Eastern Michigan 82

*denotes each overtime played

All-tournament team
 Hal Johnston (Roanoke)
 Lloyd Neal (Tennessee State)
 Len Paul (Akron)
 Jay Piccola (Roanoke)
 Leonard Robinson (Tennessee State)

Most Outstanding Player: Hal Johnston (Roanoke)

See also
 1972 NCAA University Division basketball tournament
 1972 NAIA Basketball Tournament

References

Sources
 2010 NCAA Men's Basketball Championship Tournament Records and Statistics: Division II men's basketball Championship
 1972 NCAA College Division Men's Basketball Tournament jonfmorse.com

NCAA Division II men's basketball tournament
Tournament
NCAA College Division basketball tournament
NCAA College Division basketball tournament